Juan Manuel Oliva Ramírez (born March 21, 1960 León, Guanajuato) is a Mexican politician affiliated with the National Action Party  who served as Governor of Guanajuato from 2006 to 2012.

Juan Manuel Oliva, a journalist who studied at the Escuela de Periodismo Carlos Septién García, initiated his professional career as a reporter for several newspapers of the region of the Bajío and other parts of the country.

Member of the PAN from 1989, has held diverse positions within the state structure, he has been state President of the National Action Party and has been civil employee of the Municipal Government of León. Oliva has served in the upper house of the Mexican Congress and served as general secretary of Governor Juan Carlos Romero.

See also
2006 Guanajuato state election

References

  Lic. Juan Manuel Oliva Ramírez. Government of Guanajuato. Accessed 2011-03-03.

   

1960 births
Living people
National Action Party (Mexico) politicians
Members of the Senate of the Republic (Mexico)
Politicians from Guanajuato
People from León, Guanajuato
21st-century Mexican politicians